The California Office of Systems Integration is an agency within the California Health and Human Services Agency that manages a portfolio of large, complex health and human services information technology projects.

External links
 

Systems Integration